Rajendra KC (Popular Name Rajan KC) is a leader of Nepali Congress party and newly elected member of Constituent Assembly in Nepal.
KC defeated UCPN Maoist Chairman Prachanda in Kathmandu Constituency no ten.

KC who is the member of the extended committee of Nepali Congress was elected in various position of local government including the member of Kirtipur Municipality and Council member of Kathmandu District Development in the past.

KC holds master's degree in Economics. He was born 58 years ago in Chobhar of Kathmandu.

References

Nepalese politicians
Year of birth missing (living people)
Living people